Last Roman Emperor, also called Last World Emperor or Emperor of the Last Days, is a figure of medieval European legend, which developed as an aspect of Christian eschatology. The legend predicts that in the end times, a last emperor would appear on earth to reestablish the Roman Empire and assume his function as biblical katechon who stalls the coming of the Antichrist. The legend first appears in the 7th-century apocalyptic text known as the Apocalypse of Pseudo-Methodius; that and the oracles of the Tiburtine Sibyl are its two most important sources. It developed over the centuries, becoming particularly prominent in the 15th century. The notion of Great Catholic Monarch is related to it.

Foundations

The legend is based on the Apocalypse of Pseudo-Methodius, which was, after the Book of Daniel and the Book of Revelation, "the most widespread apocalypse story in Europe". The work proposes a Last Emperor who will fight against religious enemies, most notably the then-recent spread of Islam during the Early Muslim conquests: he will "go forth against them [the enemies of the faith] from the Ethiopian sea and will send the sword and desolation into Ethribus their homeland, capturing their women and children living in the Land of Promise". After conquering his enemies he would travel to Jerusalem and relinquish his power on the Mount of Olives. The Last Emperor was further developed in the writings of Adso of Montier-en-Der, whose Libellus de Antichristo (ca. 954) was a popular biography of the Antichrist, whose coming was preceded by the rise of a Frankish ruler (the continuation of the Roman Empire); this Last Emperor would voluntarily give up his power and die, after which the Antichrist comes to power. Another important impetus came from the oracles of the Tiburtine Sibyl, first recorded in Latin around the year 1000; its legend proved particularly adaptable to rulers all over Europe, containing as it did a list of emperors and kings leading up to the Last Emperor which could be revised or added to as political and dynastic circumstances required. It still had great currency in the fifteenth century.

Catholic tradition

The concept of the Great King features prominently in mystical and folk traditions, as well as writings of people thought to have been granted gifts of prophecy or special visitations by messengers from heaven (such as angels, saints, or Christ). The Great Catholic Monarch was very popular in popular folklore until the 18th century Enlightenment. He reappeared in 19th century prophecy when French legitimists believed that Henri, Count of Chambord, would be the new king.

Marie-Julie Jahenny (1850–1941), also known as the "Breton" stigmatist, prophesied that Henry V, the Count of Chambord, was the chosen King.  Despite his death, one of her predictions dated 1890 declares he is yet "reserved for the great epochs", i.e. the end of time.

An 1871 book, Future Career of Napoleon, advocated Napoleon III's reign as Roman Emperor over a 'new ten-kingdomed Roman Empire'.

The Catechism of the Catholic Church speaks only of Christ as the king who is to be manifested in "the last days". It speaks of this manifestation as associated by his recognition by "all Israel" and preceded by the Church's ultimate trial, "a religious deception offering men an apparent solution to their problems at the price of apostasy from the truth. The supreme religious deception is that of the Antichrist, a pseudo-messianism by which man glorifies himself in place of God and of his Messiah come in the flesh". It makes no mention of the coming of any Great Catholic Monarch, whether French or German or of any continent.

The French writer and Traditionalist Catholic Yves Dupont has opined that the Great Monarch will have a restorationist character and that he will restore European Catholic royalty, destroy the power of heretics and atheists, and successfully convert many Muslims and Jews to the Faith.

See also
 Four kingdoms of Daniel
 Grand Monarch
 King Arthur's messianic return
 Prester John
 Sacred king
 Second Coming
 Son of Perdition
 Succession of the Roman Empire
 Tiburtine Sibyl
 Translatio imperii

References

Bibliography

 S.N., Mirabilis Liber, 1522
 Baethgen, Friedrich, Der Engelpapst: Vortrag gehalten am 15. Januar 1933 in öffentlicher Sitzung der Königsberger Gelehrten Gesellschaft, M. Niemeyer, Halle (Saale), 1933 OCLC 9819016
 Alexander, Paul J., Byzantium and the Migration of Literary Works and Motifs: The Legend of the Last Roman Emperor, in Medievalia et Humanistica, NS 2 (1971), p. 47 ISSN ...
 Muraise, Eric, Histoire et légende du grand monarque, Albin Michel, Paris, 1975 
 Alexander, Paul J., The Medieval Legend of the Last Roman Emperor and Its Messianic Origin, Journal of the Warburg and Courtauld Institutes, 41 (1978), pp. 1–15 ISSN ...
 Marquis de la Franquerie de la Tour, André Lesage, Le Saint Pape et le grand monarque d'après les prophéties, Editions de Chiré, Chiré-en-Montreuil, 1980 ISBN ...
 Bertin, Francis, La révolution et la parousie du grand monarque, in Politica Hermetica, 3 (1989), pp. ... ISSN ...
 Birch, Desmond A., Trial, Tribulation & Triumph: Before, During, and After Antichrist, Queenship Publishing Company, ..., 1997 
 Möhring, Hannes, Der Weltkaiser der Endzeit, Jan Thorbecke Verlag, Stuttgart, 1999 
 Otto, Helen Tzima, The Great Monarch and WWIII in Orthodox, Roman Catholic, and Scriptural Prophecies, The Verenikia Press, Rock Hill, 2000 
 Gabriele, Matthew, An Empire of Memory: The Legend of Charlemagne, the Franks, and Jerusalem before the First Crusade, Oxford University Press, Oxford, 2011 
 Rubenstein, Jay, Armies of Heaven: The First Crusade and the Quest for Apocalypse, Basic Books, 2011

External links 
 The apocalyptic myth that helps explain evangelical support for Trump

Monarchy
Traditionalist Catholicism
Christian eschatology
Medieval legends
Mythological kings
Styles (forms of address)